Children of the Ritz is a 1929 drama film from First National Pictures. Starring Dorothy Mackaill and Jack Mulhall.

The movie was silent with its own Vitaphone soundtrack and sound effects recorded on Vitaphone phonographic records, and may have been released in dual silent and sound versions.  The plot is based on a Cornell Woolrich story.

Plot
A spoiled rich girl falls for a poor chauffeur. Their situations are changed when her family loses all their money and he wins $50,000 at a racetrack. They get married, but it's not long before she starts spending their money the way she used to spend hers.

Cast
Dorothy Mackaill - Angela Pennington
Jack Mulhall - Dewey Haines
James Ford - Gil Pennington
Richard Carlyle - Mr. Pennington
Evelyn Hall - Mrs. Pennington
Kathryn McGuire - Lyle Pennington
Frank Hall Crane - Butler (*Frank Crayne)
Edmund Burns - Jerry Wilder (*Eddie Burns)
Doris Dawson - Margie Haines
Aggie Herring - Mrs. Haines
Lee Moran - Gaffney
Jane Laurell - *uncredited

Preservation status
Children of the Ritz is now considered a lost film.

External links
Children of the Ritz at IMDB

1929 films
First National Pictures films
American black-and-white films
Lost American films
Transitional sound films
Films directed by John Francis Dillon
1929 drama films
American drama films
1920s English-language films
1929 lost films
Lost drama films
1920s American films